King Dick may refer to:
 Richard Seddon (1845–1906), Prime Minister of New Zealand 1893–1906
  King Dick (film), a 1973 Italian animated adult movie
 Mechanics tools made by the Abingdon King Dick company